Sharon ( Šārôn "plain") is a given name as well as an Israeli surname.

In English-speaking areas, Sharon is now predominantly a feminine given name. However, historically it was also used as a masculine given name. In Israel, it is used both as a masculine and a feminine given name.

Etymology
The Hebrew word simply means "plain", but in the Hebrew Bible,  is the name specifically given to the fertile plain between the Samarian Hills and the coast, known (tautologically) as Sharon plain in English. The phrase "rose of Sharon" (חבצלת השרון ḥăḇaṣṣeleṯ ha-sharon) occurs in the KJV translation of the Song of Solomon ("I am the rose of Sharon, the lily of the valley"), and has since been used in reference to a number of flowering plants.

Unlike other unisex names that have come to be used almost exclusively as feminine (e.g. Evelyn), Sharon was never predominantly a masculine name. Usage before 1925 is very rare and was apparently inspired either from the Biblical toponym or one of the numerous places in the United States named after the Biblical plain.

Usage history
Use as a feminine name began in the early 20th century, first entering the statistics of the 1,000 most popularly given names in the United States in 1925.
Its inspiration was possibly the heroine of the serial novel The Skyrocket by Adela Rogers St. Johns, published in 1925 and made into a romantic drama film starring Peggy Hopkins Joyce in 1926.

The name's popularity took a steep increase only in the mid-1930s, however, and peaked during the 1940s, remaining a top 10 name for most of the decade. The variant Sharron is on record during the 1930s to 1970s, with a peak popularity in the US in 1943. The more eccentric spelling Sharyn was popular only for a brief time in the 1940s, peaking in 1945.

The name's popularity has steadily declined since the 1940s (except for a slight rise in the late 1950s), falling out of the top 100 after 1977, and out of the top 500 after 2001.

In the United Kingdom, its popularity peaked during the 1960s. It was the 10th most popular female name by 1964 and was still as high as 17th in 1974 (when it was at rank 70 in the US), but a sharp decline in popularity followed and since the 1980s it has not featured in the top 100.

While appearing on the BBC's Celebrity Mastermind, contestant Amanda Henderson was asked to name the Swedish teenage climate activist who wrote a book titled No One's Too Small to Make a Difference. Henderson answered "Sharon." Following the broadcast, climate activist Greta Thunberg (the correct response to the question) changed her name to Sharon on her Twitter bio (which remained there for the day: 3 January 2020).

People with the given name

Feminine given name
Sharon Beasley-Teague (born 1952), American politician
Sharon Bruneau (born 1964), Canadian female bodybuilder and fitness competitor
Sharon Dahlonega Raiford Bush (born 1952), American TV personality
Sharon Campbell, British diplomat
Sharon Case (born 1971), American actress
Sharon Choi (born 1994/1995), Korean-American interpreter and filmmaker
Sharon Christian (1950–2015), Canadian artist
Sharon Cohen (born 1972), more commonly known as Dana International, an Israeli pop singer
Sharon Corr (born 1970), Irish musician and member of The Corrs
Sharon Claydon (born 1964), Australian politician
Sharon Creech (born 1945), author of children's books Walk Two Moons and Ruby Holler
Sharon Cuneta (born 1966), Filipina actress and host of the Sharon talk show
Sharron Davies (born 1962), British swimmer
Sharon den Adel (born 1974), co-founder of and singer for Dutch symphonic metal band Within Temptation
Sharon Dijksma (born 1971), Dutch politician
Sharon Doorson (born 1987), Dutch singer
Sharon Epperson (born 1968), CNBC correspondent
Sharon Fichman (born 1990), Canadian/Israeli tennis player
Sharon Lee Gallegos (1955–1960), American murder victim
Sharon Gibson (born 1961), English javelin thrower
Sharon Hampson (born 1943), Canadian singer
Sharon Hanson (born 1965), American heptathlete
Sharon Hodgson (born 1966), British politician
Sharon Horgan (born 1970), Irish comedy writer
Sharon Jaklofsky (born 1968), Australian-Dutch athlete
Sharon Jordan (born 1960), American film and television actress
Sharon Kips (born 1983), Dutch singer
Sharon Lawrence (born 1961), American television actress
Sharon Leal (born 1972), American actress and director
Sharon Lee (writer) (born 1952), American novelist
Sharon G. Lee (born 1952), American judge
Sharon Lohr, American statistician
Sharon Maguire (born 1960), British film director
Sharron McClellan (born 1963), American action-adventure author
Sharon Lee (disambiguation)
Sharon Lee Myers (born 1941), stage name Jackie DeShannon, American singer
Sharon Needles (born 1981), American drag queen and winner of RuPaul's Drag Race season 4
Sharon Nesmith (born 1969/70), Brigadier of the British Army
Sharon Osbourne (born 1952), English music promoter and TV personality, wife and manager of Ozzy Osbourne
Sharon Que (born 1960), American artist
Sharon Quirk-Silva (born 1962), American politician
Sharon Redd (born 1945), American singer
Sharon Rendle (born 1966), British judoka
Sharon Shannon (born 1968), Irish musician
Sharon Shapiro, American gymnast
Sharon Alaina Stephen (born 1987), Malaysian actress
Sharon Stone (born 1958), American actress, model and producer
Sharon Tate (1943–1969), American actress 
Sharon Tyler Herbst (1942–2007), American chef and author
Sharon Tyler, American politician
Sharon Van Etten (born 1981), American singer-songwriter
Sharon Waxman (born c.1963), American journalist
Sharon Weston Broome (born 1956), American politician
Sharon Witherspoon, British statistician
Sharon White (born 1967), British businesswoman and civil servant
Sharon Yaish, Israeli film director
Sharon Zukin (born 1946), American academic
Sharon Zukowski (1954/55–2015), American mystery novelist

Masculine given name 
 Sharon Turner (1768–1847), English historian
 Sharon Tyndale (1816–1871), American politician
 Sharon Rotbard (born 1959), Israeli architect publisher and author
 Sharon Drucker (born 1967), Israeli professional basketball coach
 Sharon Shason (born 1979), retired Israeli basketball player
 Sharon Afek (born 1970), Israeli general
 Sharon Yaari (born 1966), Israeli photographer

People with the surname
Sharon was adopted as a surname by Zionist emigrants in the context of the Hebrew revival in the early 20th century, and has since become a heritable Israeli surname.
 Arieh Sharon (born Ludwig Kurzmann, 1900–1984), Israeli architect
 Ariel Sharon (born Ariel Scheinermann, 1928–2014), Israeli Prime Minister. Scheinermann was given the surname Sharon by David Ben-Gurion in c. 1948.
 Avraham Sharon (born Abraham Schwadron, 1878–1957), Israeli intellectual
 Moshe Sharon (born 1937), Israeli scholar of Islamic history and civilization, author i.a. of the Corpus Inscriptionum Arabicarum Palaestinae, a work in progress planned to contain all ancient Arabic inscriptions found in the Holy Land
 Omri Sharon (born 1964), Israeli politician, son of the former Israeli Prime Minister Ariel Sharon
Revital Sharon (born 1970), Israeli Olympic artistic gymnast
 Yuval Sharon, American stage director
 Carma Sharon, Australian actress, director and producer

Pseudonym
 Deke Sharon, stage name of Kurk Richard Toohey (born 1967), American singer, musician, producer

Fictional characters
Sharon (シャロン), a character from the Street Fighter EX series
Sharon Carter, a Marvel Comics character
Sharon Collins Newman, a character in the daytime soap opera The Young and The Restless
Sharon Cooper, a character in the 1982 musical film Grease 2
Sharon, a Doctor Who magazine character
Sharon Jellinsky, a minor character in the film Addams Family Values
Sharon Kaneko, supporting character in anime and manga series Space Brothers (manga)
Sharon Kaur, a character played by Jez Dhillon in the British web series Corner Shop Show
Sharon Marsh, a character on South Park
Sharon McGee, a character from The Ghost and Molly McGee
Sharon Potter, a character from the American TV sitcom Get a Life (1990–1992)
Sharon Rainworth, a character in the manga and anime series Pandora Hearts
Sharon Strzelecki, a character from Kath & Kim
Sharon Esther Spitz, the protagonist of the Canadian animated TV series Braceface
Sharon Valerii, a character from Battlestar Galactica
Rose of Sharon Joad Rivers, a character from The Grapes of Wrath
Sharon Rai Prakash, a character from the Indian seris Dil Dosti Dance
Sharon Watts, a character from the British soap opera EastEnders

Placenames

Sharon, Ontario, Canada
Sharon, Connecticut
Sharonville, Ohio
Sharon, Pennsylvania
Sharon Springs, New York
Sharon Springs, Kansas
Sharon, Massachusetts
Sharon, New Jersey
Sharon, Vermont
Sharon, South Carolina
Sharon, Georgia
Sharon, North Dakota
Sharon, Queensland, Australia

References

Given names
Feminine given names
Masculine given names
English given names
English feminine given names
Jewish given names
Hebrew-language surnames